On is the third EP by English electronic musician Aphex Twin, released on 15 November 1993 by Warp. On Remixes, featuring remixes by James, Reload and μ-Ziq, was released on the same day.

The single peaked at number 32 on the UK Singles Chart.

Track listing

The Sire Records (US) version of On contains only "On", "73-Yips", and "Xepha" with early fade-outs, followed by the Reload Mix of "On", and it is housed in an Ecopak case instead of the standard slimline jewel case in which the Warp (UK) release was packaged.

The "D-Scape Mix", in actuality a remix of "D-Scape" from On, features mostly harsh sucking noises.

Music video
The music video for the title track was directed by Jarvis Cocker and Martin Wallace, and features a stop-motion sequence filmed on a beach involving numerous props (including an old fashioned diving suit and a cardboard cutout of James), and images of the tide. Drips of water are synchronized with the piano. The film was shot on location in Hilbre Island, West Kirby, Wirral, UK. James was not involved in the video's making, apart from insisting that it did not feature any computer graphics. He was satisfied with the end result, stating that it "does the job". It is available on the Come to Viddy (VHS, 1997) and WarpVision: The Videos 1989–2004 (DVD, 2004) compilations.

References

External links
On at the Warp Records website

1993 EPs
Aphex Twin EPs
Sire Records EPs
Warp (record label) EPs